KUOL (94.5 FM) is a radio station licensed to serve Elko, Nevada. The station is owned by Global 1 Media LLC. It airs a classic hits format.

The station was assigned the KOYT call letters by the Federal Communications Commission on September 1, 2005, and changed to KZBI on August 1, 2010.

On September 1, 2020, KZBI changed its call sign to KUOL. On September 10, 2020, the station flipped to classic hits as "94.5 Kool-FM", as part of a format swap between KUOL and K299AN/KUOL-HD2, which now airs KUOL's former news/talk format as "Talk Radio 107.7".

Previous logo

References

External links

UOL
Classic hits radio stations in the United States
Elko, Nevada
Radio stations established in 2006
2006 establishments in Nevada